In mathematics, in the field of group theory, an FC-group is a group in which every conjugacy class of elements has finite cardinality.

The following are some facts about FC-groups:

 Every finite group is an FC-group.
 Every abelian group is an FC-group.
 The following property is stronger than the property of being FC: every subgroup has finite index in its normal closure.

Notes

References
. Reprint of Prentice-Hall edition, 1964.

Infinite group theory
Properties of groups